Myripristis seychellensis, the shy soldier, is a species of soldierfish belonging to the genus Myripristis. It can be found in the Western Indian Ocean in Madagascar, Réunion, the St. Brandon Shoals and Seychelles, which it is named after. It can also possibly be found in Taiwan It can be found hiding in caves.

References

seychellensis
Fish of the Indian Ocean
Taxa named by Georges Cuvier